Englevale may refer to:
Englevale, California, former name of Englewood, California
Englevale, Kansas
Englevale, North Dakota